Melionica bertha is a moth of the family Noctuidae described by William Schaus and W. G. Clements in 1893. It is found in the Democratic Republic of the Congo, Nigeria and Sierra Leone.

References

Hadeninae
Moths of Africa
Moths described in 1893